Progress M-66, identified by NASA as Progress 32P, was a Progress spacecraft used to resupply the International Space Station. It was the penultimate flight of the Progress-M 11F615A55 spacecraft, using the spacecraft with the serial number 366.

Launch
Progress M-66 was launched at 05:49 UTC on 10 February 2009, by a Soyuz-U carrier rocket flying from Site 31/6 at the Baikonur Cosmodrome. This was the first time Site 31 had been used for a Progress launch since Progress M-15 in 1992.

Docking
The spacecraft docked with the Pirs module of the ISS at 07:18 UTC on 13 February 2009. It undocked at 15:18 UTC on 6 May 2009, to make way for Progress M-02M. It was deorbited at 14:28:30 UTC on 18 May 2009 following twelve days of free flight, during which it conducted experiments as part of the Plazma-Progress programme. Any debris from Progress M-66 that survived re-entry landed in the Pacific Ocean at around 15:14:45 UTC.

Cargo
Progress M-66 delivered supplies to the International Space Station, including fuel, food and water for the crew, and equipment for conducting scientific research and establishing a 6-man crew capacity aboard the ISS. It also carried a new Orlan-MK spacesuit to replace one of the older Orlan-M suits previously used for EVAs from the station.

See also

 List of Progress flights
 Uncrewed spaceflights to the International Space Station

References

Spacecraft launched in 2009
Progress (spacecraft) missions
Spacecraft which reentered in 2009
Supply vehicles for the International Space Station
Spacecraft launched by Soyuz-U rockets